'She's On My Mind' is a song by English singer JP Cooper. It was released as the fourth single of his debut studio album Raised Under Grey Skies.

The song was released as a digital download in the United Kingdom on 21 July 2017 through Island Records. The song has charted in Belgium. The song was written by John Paul Cooper, Teemu Brunila, Benjamin McIldowie and Jon Cobbe Hume.

Background
In an interview with Fortitude Magazine, JP Cooper talked about the single by saying, "The title says it all, 'She’s on My Mind' is a song about having somebody invade your thoughts no matter how much you try to move forward, I’m sure most people have experienced this and we wanted the song to have the same infectious effect.

"I’m so glad we managed to release this before the summer is over as it’s definitely a song to enjoy in the sun. Written with the same close friends that I wrote September Song with, it was a lot of fun bringing this one to life."

In an interview with the Official Charts Company, he was asked if he expected his output as a musician to be this slow? He replied: "It’s difficult to put out another song when people are still enjoying your current one. It’s a weird one because [September Song] just keeps going. It was staggered as well, so by the time we got going with the next single Passport Home, radio was only just picking up September Song. I feel like everyone's in sync with the new single She's On My Mind, so we'll see how that goes. It'd be great to get another big one in the bag."

Accompanying video
An official lyric video to accompany the release of 'She's on My Mind' was first released onto YouTube on 20 July 2017 at a total length of two minutes and fifty-nine seconds.

An official promo video - clocking at three minutes and fifteen seconds - also appeared online on 27 September 2017.

A live stripped back version of the song filmed in a mocked-up cafe has been uploaded by Vevo too.

Track listing

Charts

Certifications

Release history

References

2017 singles
2017 songs
Island Records singles
JP Cooper songs
Songs written by Mr Hudson
Songs written by Jon Hume
Songs written by JP Cooper
Songs written by Teemu Brunila